Aeromicrobium is a Gram-positive, aerobic, non-spore-forming and non-motile bacterial genus from the family of Nocardioidaceae.

References

Further reading 
 
 
 
 
 
 
 

Propionibacteriales
Bacteria genera